Thurgauer Kantonalbank is a cantonal bank serving the Swiss canton of Thurgau.  The head office is based in Weinfelden.

History
Thurgauer Kantonalbank (TKB) was founded in 1871.  Thurgauer Kantonalbank is the 22nd largest bank in Switzerland, and 10th largest of the cantonal banks in the country. As of 2020, Thurgauer Kantonalbank recorded an annual profit of £139.08 mln CHF.

In 2014, Thurgauer Kantonalbank went through an IPO and became listed on the Swiss Stock Exchange. The canton provided CHF 50 million of the share capital or 12.5% for this purpose. The offer was oversubscribed several times and generated proceeds of CHF 185 million, all of which went to the canton of Thurgau.

In 2017, the bank sold all of its shares in the Swiss National Bank.

Products & Services
Thurgauer Kantonalbank offer both retail and business services.  The bank has 28 locations and 70 ATMs across the canton.

See also
Cantonal bank
List of banks
List of banks in Switzerland

References

External links
 Official website

Cantonal banks
Companies listed on the SIX Swiss Exchange
Banks established in 1871
Swiss companies established in 1871